The James Madison Institute (JMI) is a free-market American think tank headquartered in Tallahassee, Florida in the United States. It is a member of the State Policy Network. The organization's stated mission is "to keep the citizens of Florida informed about their government and to shape our state’s future through the advancement of practical free-market ideas on public policy issues."

History 
JMI was founded in Tallahassee, Florida in 1987 by J. Stanley Marshall, a former president of Florida State University. JMI is named after James Madison, the fourth President of the United States, third Secretary of State, author of the U.S. Constitution, and co-author of The Federalist Papers.

Policy positions
The institute is a supporter of increased educational choice through charter schools and school vouchers.

The institute believes that a cleaner environment and economic liberty are not mutually exclusive goals, and that private property rights and market incentives will encourage good stewardship. In 2015, JMI absorbed the Orlando-based Coalition for Property Rights into its Center for Property Rights.

The institute believes that direct personal responsibility for health care controls costs and provides individuals with incentives to make healthy choices. JMI supports market-based, consumer-driven reforms such as health savings accounts (HSAs) as a way to improve the quality of health services and increase access to the uninsured.

Various JMI studies have shown that economic growth varies inversely with tax growth and that, dollar-for-dollar, private sector activity is more productive than public sector activity. JMI supports reforms that emphasize low tax rates and less government spending. In 2015, JMI launched the Center for Economic Prosperity.

References

External links 

 
 EDIRC listing (provided by RePEc)
 Profile at Charity Navigator
 Organizational Profile – National Center for Charitable Statistics (Urban Institute)

1987 establishments in Florida
Political and economic think tanks in the United States
Libertarian think tanks
Libertarian organizations based in the United States